Strings Music Festival, in Steamboat Springs, Colorado, is a music festival featuring classical, jazz, blues, Americana, country and youth performances over an 8 week period every summer.

About

Strings Music Festival is a nonprofit, 501(c)(3) organization and operates with the support of sponsors and individual donors. Strings Music Festival hosts more than 90 classical and non-classical music events the majority of which take place in eight weeks every summer from June to August.  Concerts are also presented in other months of the year.  The Festival includes orchestra, chamber music, contemporary music, jazz, blues, Americana, youth events, lectures, outreach performances and free events.

Strings Music Festival was founded in 1988 as Strings in the Mountains with 8 classical performances held on the deck of the Steamboat Athletic Club. In 1990 the first non-classical acts Leo Kottke and Karla Bonoff were presented. In 1992 Strings erected a tent at Torian Plum property to host the festivals performances.  Strings then changed from a 300 seat venue to a structure that could accommodate 500 people. In 1992 Strings Music Festival was put on the map when world-renowned conductor of the St. Louis Symphony, Leonard Slatkin, came to conduct a Chamber Orchestra.  CBS Morning News covered the event and gave Strings Music Festival their first national news recognition  In 2003 Strings purchased seven acres of land for its new home at the current location of 900 Strings Rd.  In 2007 The Festivals name was officially changed to Strings Music Festival, and a year later a permanent  Music Pavilion was constructed. The pavilion was a 4.3 million dollar capital project and with the help of Steamboat Architectural Associates and D.L Adams Associates of Denver the project was complete in just nine months.

Classical Music Directors

Strings welcomed the year 2015 and the upcoming 28th Season by collaborating with a new music director, Michael Sachs. For the past 26 years, Sachs has been Principal Trumpet for the Cleveland Orchestra and fell in love with Colorado years ago when he spent a summer in Aspen. He is recognized internationally as a leading soloist, recitalist, chamber musician, teacher, author and clinician.

Sachs began his contract in the fall of 2014, and his concerts will kick off in the summer of 2015. His agenda includes adding a few of his favorite players from institutions and universities all around the world including the orchestras of Chicago, Boston, New York, Philadelphia, Dallas and L.A., as well as bringing back some of the great chamber musicians and orchestral players that have been to Strings year after year.

In 2009 Andrés Cárdenes and his wife Monique Mead took over as the Classic Music Directors of the festival. 
Cárdenes studied under Josef Gingold and has over 30 years as a professional musician.   In 1982 he won 2nd prize at the International Tchaikovsky Competition, which helped launch his global career. Cuban-born Andrés Cárdenes has performed as a soloist with more than 100 orchestras and served as Concertmaster of the Pittsburgh Symphony Orchestra for 21 seasons and as the Artistic Director of the Pittsburgh Symphony Chamber Orchestra since 1999. Cárdenes continues to teach and maintain a studio at the Carnegie Mellon University as well as guest teaching at the Curtis Institute, Toronto's Royal Conservatory, Shanghai Conservatory and Calgary's Mt. Royal College. He is also the President of the jury of the Stradivarius International Violin Competition. From the whimsical to the profound, Andres and Monique final season as the Classical Music Directors offered a colorful array of musical experiences at every classical concert. The 27th season delivered repertoire included Tchaikovsky, Piazzolla, Dvorak to Broadway and Wolfgang Amadeus Mozart are a few of the composers that were featured at the Strings Music Pavilion.

References

External links

Music festivals established in 1988
Music festivals in Colorado
Classical music festivals in the United States